Chicoine is a surname. Notable people with the surname include:

Dan Chicoine (born 1957), Canadian ice hockey player
David L. Chicoine, American university administrator and businessman
Roland A. Chicoine (1922–2016), American politician
Sylvain Chicoine (born 1970), Canadian politician